The Nürtingen-Geislingen University (German: Hochschule für Wirtschaft und Umwelt Nürtingen-Geislingen) is a public university of applied sciences based in Nürtingen and Geislingen an der Steige, Baden-Wuerttemberg, Germany.

History 
The „Höhere Landbauschule“ (Higher Agricultural College) was founded in 1949, but the name was later changed to School of Agricultural Engineering. A statute of the 6th of February 1972 integrated it into the University of Applied Science of Nuertingen.
Nuertingen University originally offered courses in Agriculture, Business Economics and Landscape Maintenance and in 1988 built a second facility in Geislingen an der Steige with courses in Automotive Industry, Economic Law, Health and Tourist Management and 
Energy and Recycling Management.

In the frame of the Bologna Process for Internationalisation of Professional Qualifications all Diploma courses were transformed into Bachelor courses.

In 2009, all activities in the area of "International Finance“ were consolidated into the European School of Finance (ESF). This embraced the Bachelor course “International Finance Management” and the Masters course “International Finance” together with all 
teaching and research activities.

On 24 April 2012, the College and the affiliated “European Institute for Financial Engineering and Related Research” (EIFD) received the Educational Award of the Education Foundation.

Faculties 
Faculty of Business of Economics and International Finance:
Faculty of Agribusiness, National Economics and Management:
Faculty of Landscape Architecture, Environment- and Town Planning:
Faculty of Economics and Law:

Notable professors and alumni 
Andreas Frey (born 1967), German economic scientist und Rector (2013- )
Johannes Knecht (1904–1990), German agricultural economist und Director (1949–1968)
Rolf Kosiek (born 1934), German publicist
Konstanze Krüger (born 1968), German zoologist and behavioral scientist 
Eduard Mändle (1936–2013), German economist und Rector (1977–2001)
Markus Mändle (born 1967), German economist
Hosam el Miniawy (born 1976), German politician (FDP)
Eduard Nohe (1911–1984), German agricultural scientist and Rector (1968–1973)
Manfred G. Raupp (born 1941), German agricultural scientist and economist
Dieter Rebitzer (born 1965), German financial expert in the property business
Judit Varga (born 1980), Hungarian politician and Minister of Justice (2019– )
Werner Ziegler (born 1950), German economist and Rector (2007–2013)

References

 Eduard Mändle: Fachhochschule Nürtingen: 50 Jahre. Sonderband der Nürtinger Hochschulschriften Nr. 2-1999, herausgegeben von Karl-Heinz Kappelmann, Nürtingen 1999.

External links
 Official website
 Official English website

Universities and colleges in Baden-Württemberg
Educational institutions established in 1949
Universities of Applied Sciences in Germany
Agricultural universities and colleges in Germany
1949 establishments in Germany